Barzilai Medical Center (Merkaz Refu'i Barzilai) is a 617-bed district general hospital in Ashkelon in southern Israel. The hospital serves a population of 500,000, including a large number of Ethiopian and Russian immigrants, and has more than 100,000 admissions annually. Situated six miles from Gaza, it has been the target of numerous Qassam and Grad rocket attacks, sometimes as many as 140 in one weekend. The hospital plays a vital role in treating wounded soldiers and terror victims. A Muslim holy site destroyed in 1950, the Shrine of Husayn's Head was rebuilt in 2000 within the Hospital premises.

History

The Barzilai University Medical Center opened in 20 July 1961, and was initially named Ashkelon Hospital. Construction was financed by the Ministry of Health with the assistance of the South African Zionist Federation, the Ashkelon municipality and Mifal HaPayis. The building was designed by the architect David Anatol Brutzkus, covering an area of 8,000m². In 1971, it was renamed after Minister of Health Yisrael Barzilai, who had laid the cornerstone of the building in the early 1960s, and who had died the previous year.

Plans to build a new rocket and missile-proof emergency room for the hospital in 2010 were hampered by ultra-orthodox protests sparked by the discovery of human remains in an ancient burial ground unearthed during construction activities.

Landmarks

Shrine of Husayn's Head 

A section of the grounds of the hospital is believed by some Shia Muslims to have been the burial place of the head of Husayn ibn Ali, a grandson of Muhammad. It was secretly moved by the Abbasids from its original burial site at The Great Mosque of Damascus. In the 11th century, Badr al-Jamali discovered the location and built a shrine known as the Shrine of Husayn's Head at the direction of the Fatimid Imam-Caliph, Ma'ad al-Mustansir. The shrine has since been a pilgrimage site for Shi'a Muslims and historically also Palestinian Sunnis.

In July 1950 the multi-storey structure was destroyed by Israel Defense Forces under instructions from Moshe Dayan. Around 2000, a marble platform was installed at the site by Mohammed Burhanuddin, the 52nd Da'i al-Mutlaq of the Dawoodi Bohras, an Ismaili sect of predominantly Gujarati descent, who continue to visit Ashkelon despite resulting complications in travelling to other Muslim nations.

References

Hospital buildings completed in 1961
Hospitals in Israel
Hospitals established in 1961
Buildings and structures in Ashkelon